Huillard may refer to:

 Paul Huillard (1875-1996), French designer and architect
 Xavier Huillard (born 1954), French business executive and the current CEO of Vinci SA

See also
 Beauchamps-sur-Huillard, a commune in the Loiret department in north-central France
 Chevillon-sur-Huillard, a commune in the Loiret department in north-central France
 Guillard, a surname